Lafayette (Lafe) Pence (December 23, 1857 – October 22, 1923) was a U.S. Representative from Colorado.

Born in Columbus, Indiana, Pence attended the common schools.
He was graduated from Hanover (Indiana) College in 1877.
He studied law.
He was admitted to the bar in 1878 and practiced in Columbus, Indiana, until September 1879, when he moved to Winfield, Kansas.
He moved to Rico, Colorado, in 1881 and continued the practice of law until 1884.
He served as member of the State house of representatives in 1885.
He settled in Denver in 1885 and continued the practice of law.
He served as prosecuting attorney for Arapahoe County in 1887 and 1888.

Pence was elected as a Populist to the Fifty-third Congress (March 4, 1893 – March 3, 1895).
He was an unsuccessful candidate for reelection in 1894 to the Fifty-fourth Congress.
He moved to New York City and engaged in railroad work.
He returned to Denver and from there moved to San Francisco, California, and subsequently to Washington, D.C., and continued the practice of law.
He also engaged in hydraulic mining in Breckenridge, Colorado, and Portland, Oregon.
He died in Washington, D.C., October 22, 1923.
He was interred in Garland Brook Cemetery, Columbus, Indiana.

References

Lefe Pence was the name used by Author Ingersoll Lockwood for The Minister of Agriculture in his 1894 book ' The Last President '.

1857 births
1923 deaths
People from Columbus, Indiana
People's Party members of the United States House of Representatives from Colorado
Hanover College alumni